Tryblidium reticulatum is an extinct species of a paleozoic Silurian monoplacophoran.

This species have been discovered and originally described by Gustaf Lindström from Silurian of Gotland in Sweden in 1880. It lived in shallow water.

Shell description

The length of the shell is 43 mm, width 31 mm and the height of the shell is 10 mm.

There are visible muscular attachment scars on the ventral view.

References
This article incorporates public domain text from reference.

External links

Prehistoric monoplacophorans
Molluscs described in 1880